Callistocypraea nivosa is a species of sea snail, a cowry, a marine gastropod mollusk in the family Cypraeidae, the cowries.

Description

Distribution
This species is distributed in the Gulf of Bengal along Myanmar and Thailand and in the Pacific Ocean along Sumatra.

References

 Lorenz, F. (2017). Cowries. A guide to the gastropod family Cypraeidae. Volume 1, Biology and systematics. Harxheim: ConchBooks. 644 pp

External links
 
 Broderip, W. J. (1827). Description of some new and rare shells. The Zoological Journal. 3: 81-85

Cypraeidae
Gastropods described in 1827